Xyrichtys is a genus of wrasses native to the Atlantic, Indian and Pacific Oceans, where they are found in sandy-bottomed habitats. They are commonly known as razorfishes, as they are very laterally compressed with a sharp bony ridge at the front of their heads. This adaptation allows them to burrow very quickly into the sand at any sign of danger.

Species
The 11 currently recognized species in this genus are:
 Xyrichtys blanchardi (Cadenat & Marchal, 1963) (marmalade razorfish)
 Xyrichtys incandescens A. J. Edwards & Lubbock, 1981 (Brazilian razorfish)
 Xyrichtys javanicus (Bleeker, 1862) (Java razorfish)
 Xyrichtys martinicensis Valenciennes, 1840 (rosy razorfish)
 Xyrichtys mundiceps T. N. Gill, 1862 (Cape razorfish)
 Xyrichtys novacula (Linnaeus, 1758) (pearly razorfish)
 Xyrichtys rajagopalani Venkataramanujam, Venkataramani & Ramanathan, 1987 (Rajagopalan's razorfish)
 Xyrichtys sanctaehelenae (Günther, 1868) (yellow razorfish)
 Xyrichtys splendens Castelnau, 1855 (green razorfish)
 Xyrichtys victori Wellington, 1992 (Galapagos razorfish)
 Xyrichtys wellingtoni G. R. Allen & D. R. Robertson, 1995 (Clipperton razorfish)

Gallery

References

 
Labridae
Marine fish genera
Taxa named by Georges Cuvier